Rubén García Jr. (born November 21, 1995) is a Mexican professional stock car racing driver. He competes full-time in the  NASCAR Peak Mexico Series, driving the No. 88 for Canel's Racing.

Racing career

Motorsports career results

NASCAR
(key) (Bold – Pole position awarded by qualifying time. Italics – Pole position earned by points standings or practice time. * – Most laps led.)

Nationwide Series

K&N Pro Series East

PEAK Mexico Series

References

External links
 
 

Living people
1995 births
NASCAR drivers
Mexican racing drivers
Racing drivers from Mexico City